Bill Duff (born February 24, 1974) is a former National Football League, NFL Europe, and Arena Football League defensive tackle, and host of Human Weapon on the History Channel. He holds a brown belt in Tang Soo Do, a Korean martial art he refers to as "Korean Street Fighting".

Duff grew up in Delran Township, New Jersey and attended Delran High School, where he was also an All-American wrestler.

Duff was the co-captain of the 1997 Tennessee Volunteers, and played for the Cleveland Browns in their expansion year 1999–2000. He started for the Orlando Rage in the XFL and played in 2002 for the Berlin Thunder of NFL Europe. He later played in the Arena Football League for the Indiana Firebirds and Columbus Destroyers.

References

External links
NFL stats
AFL stats

1974 births
Living people
Delran High School alumni
People from Delran Township, New Jersey
People from Riverside Township, New Jersey
American football defensive tackles
Tennessee Volunteers football players
Cleveland Browns players
Berlin Thunder players
Indiana Firebirds players
Columbus Destroyers players
American television personalities
Orlando Rage players
Players of American football from New Jersey
American tang soo do practitioners
Sportspeople from Burlington County, New Jersey